Robert Burns Aird (5 November 1903 – 28 January 2000) was an American educator, neurologist and epileptologist.

Aird's father, Dr. John Aird, founded Provo General Hospital in Provo, Utah, with two other doctors, Dr. Fred W. Taylor and George E. Robison, in 1903. The hospital was the first general hospital in Utah County. In 1923 the partnership broke up and Dr. John Aird continued the hospital under the name of the Aird Hospital from 1923 to 1939 when Utah Valley Hospital was opened. Robert Aird's grandfather and grandmother, William Aird and Elizabeth McLean, were Scottish immigrants and the family was proud of its heritage, thus the name "Robert Burns" Aird, after the famous Scottish poet.  His uncle, Henry McLean Aird, was a prominent educator in Utah.

After education at Deep Springs College, Cornell University, and Harvard Medical School, Aird worked first as a neurosurgeon and then as a neurologist at the University of California at San Francisco (UCSF). He was made the first chair when the Department of Neurology was created in 1949 and was professor and chair until his retirement in 1966.
 
In addition to conducting his own research (Flynn Aird syndrome bears his name), Aird developed the department into a leading academic center for the study of the brain sciences, drawing future Nobel laureate Stanley Prusiner as a resident late during Aird's tenure. From 1958 to 1959 he served as president of the American Epilepsy Society (AES) and received its Lennox Award in 1970.

Aird wrote a history of modern neurology and coauthored 2 textbooks on epilepsy.

A lifelong musician, Aird was president of the Cornell University Glee Club as an undergraduate, and during his tenure as neurology chairman at UCSF wrote a musical about the life of Joshua A. Norton (ca. 1815-1880), the mentally ill self-proclaimed Emperor of the United States and Mexico.

References

Further reading
Robert Aird archival collection at UCSF

1903 births
2000 deaths
American epileptologists
Cornell University alumni
Deep Springs College alumni
Deep Springs College faculty
Harvard Medical School alumni
University of California, San Francisco faculty